The Six Paths in Buddhist cosmology the six worlds where sentient beings are reincarnated according to their karmas linked to their acts of previous lives. They are represented pictorially in the form of the Bhavacakra ("wheel of existence")."). these are:

 the world of gods or celestial beings (deva) ;
 the world of warlike demigods (asura) ;
 the world of human beings (manushya) ;
 the world of animals (tiryagyoni) ;
 the world of the starving (preta) ;
 the world of Hell (naraka).

The first three are called "the three benevolent destinies" (kuśalagati), where beings are more or less virtuous, there is pleasure and there is pain, and the last three are called the three unbenevolent destinies (akuśalagati), where beings lack virtue, there is almost only suffering. We human beings normally only see the animals besides ourselves. The first Buddhist texts mention only five paths, not differentiating between the paths of the devas and the asuras. In Japan, the monk Genshin even unexplainably places the way of men below that of the asura.

The Pudgala that transmigrates between these six destinies is not a person or a self, not a soul, but an aggregate (Skandha), a phenomenal continuity with changing elements.

The elements forming karma are constituted in bodily, oral or mental volitional acts. The chain of transmigration due to the Three Poisons (hatred, greed, ignorance), of which ignorance (avidyā) of the ultimate truth (Sanskrit: paramārtha; Chinese: zhēndì 真谛) or the true law (Sanskrit: saddharma, सद्धर्म, correct law; Chinese: miàofǎ, 妙法, marvelous law) is generally presented as the source of reincarnation in the three non-benevolent destinies.

See also 

 Bhavacakra

References 

Sanskrit words and phrases
Buddhist terminology
Pages with unreviewed translations